Concord Coach Lines, Inc., formerly known as Concord Trailways, and often referred to as Concord Coach, is an inter-city bus company based in Concord, New Hampshire. It serves parts of Maine, New Hampshire and eastern Massachusetts, and has a route  to New York City.

The company was founded in 1967, and expanded in 1988 with the purchase of the Trailways franchise. Service to Maine commenced in 1992. The company's relationship with Trailways Transportation System was dissolved in 2008, and the name reverted to "Concord Coach Lines".

It operates two subsidiary bus lines: Boston Express. which runs between points in central New Hampshire and Boston; and Dartmouth Coach, which runs from Hanover, New Hampshire and the Upper Valley area to Boston and to New York City.

Equipment
The current fleet consists entirely of Prevost X3-45 buses. The buses wear a red, white, and blue color scheme over a white base. Previous vehicles in the fleet have included the Motor Coach Industries J4500, MC-8, MC-9 and D4500.

Service area
Concord Coach Lines operates along the Interstate 95 corridor between Bangor, Maine, and Boston, Massachusetts, as well as the Interstate 93 corridor in New Hampshire with service from Berlin and Littleton through Concord to Boston and Logan International Airport.

Specifically it connects the following locations:

Maine

 Orono (University of Maine)
 Bangor
 Searsport
 Belfast
 Lincolnville
 Camden/Rockport
 Rockland
 Waldoboro
 Damariscotta
 Wiscasset 
 Bath
 Brunswick (Bowdoin College)
 Waterville (Colby College)
 Augusta
 Portland

New Hampshire

 Berlin
 Gorham
 Pinkham Notch
 Jackson
 North Conway
 Conway
 West Ossipee
 Moultonborough
 Center Harbor
 Meredith
 New Hampton
 Littleton
 Franconia
 Lincoln
 Plymouth
 Tilton
 Concord
 Manchester
 Londonderry

Massachusetts
 Boston (South Station Bus Terminal)
 Boston (Logan International Airport)

New York
 New York City

Connections
 Amtrak Northeast Corridor service at Boston South Station
 Amtrak Downeaster at Portland Transportation Center

Concord Coach Lines provides Amtrak Thruway Motorcoach service from Portland to Bangor and from Manchester to Boston.

Rider controversies

On May 28, 2018, a Customs and Border Patrol agent was recorded asking passengers about their citizenship status while they waited at the Bangor, Maine, terminal to board a bus to Boston. When asked, a Concord Coach employee stated that passengers must be US citizens to ride. Concord Coach Lines later released a statement on Facebook clarifying their policies, indicating that the employee was unprepared to answer that question, and that company-wide training had been put in place to address the issue. 

The following August, a 14-year old Pakistani-American was prevented from boarding a bus leaving Rockland, Maine, by the driver. Despite being accompanied by an adult, the bus driver asked him for identification and would not let him board without it. The bus left without the teen, who had to ask the family of his friend to get a ride back to Massachusetts. Concoard Coach Lines policy does not state that children have to show ID. Concord denied that the teen was stranded due to the color of their skin, stating that the driver did not notice the teen's ethnicity.

References

External links
 

Intercity bus companies of the United States
Bus transportation in Maine
Bus transportation in Massachusetts
Bus transportation in New Hampshire
Transportation in Portland, Maine
Companies based in Merrimack County, New Hampshire
Transportation companies based in New Hampshire